Cheryl Boyd-Waddell (born Margaret Cheryl Boyd, March 31, 1952 – April 27, 2002) was an American operatic soprano and voice teacher. She was particularly known for her performances of works by contemporary classical composers.

A graduate of University of Southern California in 1974, she went on to receive her master's degree and Doctorate in voice performance from the Eastman School of Music. She was a member of the chamber ensemble, Thamyris, from 1988. She appeared with the ensemble at the Spoleto Festival USA and premiered over 30 new works with them, including Songs of Love and Longing by Stephen Paulus. At the time of her death, she was voice professor and director of vocal activities at Clayton State University in Georgia.

Recordings
Cheryl Boyd-Waddell appears as soprano soloist with the Thamyris ensemble on the following recordings:
Alvin Singleton: Extension of a Dream. Label: Albany Records
No Longer Of That World – Music of Karl Boelter. Label: Aca Digital
A City Called Heaven. Label: Aca Digital

References

External links
Thamyris official website

2002 deaths
American sopranos
1952 births
20th-century American women opera singers